John Melvin Yates, (born November 25, 1939 in Superior, Montana) is a Career Foreign Service Officer, held several ambassadorships during his career. He was the American Ambassador Extraordinary and Plenipotentiary to Cape Verde (1983-1986), Chargé d’Affaires ad interim (Congo (Kinshasa) 1992-1995), Ambassador Extraordinary and Plenipotentiary to Benin (1995-1998), and concurrent positions to Cameroon and Equatorial Guinea (1999-2001).

Yates graduated from Stanford University (A.B., 1961) and the Fletcher School of Law and Diplomacy (M.A., 1962; M.A.L.D., 1963; Ph. D., 1972). 

In March of 2000, Yates was slightly injured during an attempted carjacking when he left an embassy function in Cameroon.

References

1939 births
Stanford University alumni
The Fletcher School at Tufts University alumni
Ambassadors of the United States to Cape Verde
Ambassadors of the United States to Benin
Ambassadors of the United States to Cameroon
Ambassadors of the United States to Equatorial Guinea
Living people